Paralomis africana is a species of king crab found off the coast of Namibia.

References

King crabs
Crabs of the Atlantic Ocean
Arthropods of Namibia
Crustaceans of Africa
Crustaceans described in 1982